"She's on the Left" is a 1988 single by Jeffrey Osborne. The single was the most successful of Osborne's solo career, reaching the number-one spot on the Black Singles chart and becoming his only number one. "She's on the Left" was his last release to make the Hot 100 peaking at number forty-eight.  The single also became one of Osborne's most successful on the dance chart peaking at number six.

References
 

1988 singles
Jeffrey Osborne songs
Songs written by Tony Haynes
Songs written by Jeffrey Osborne
1988 songs
Songs written by Robert Brookins